Historically there have been differences among investigators regarding the definition of organizational culture. Edgar Schein, a leading researcher in this field, defined "organizational culture" as comprising a number of features, including a shared "pattern of basic assumptions" which group members have acquired over time as they learn to successfully cope with internal and external organizationally relevant problems. Elliott Jaques first introduced the concept of culture in the organizational context in his 1951 book The Changing Culture of a Factory. The book was a published report of "a case study of developments in the social life of one industrial community between April, 1948 and November 1950". The "case" involved a publicly-held British company engaged principally in the manufacture, sale, and servicing of metal bearings. The study concerned itself with the description, analysis, and development of corporate group behaviours.

Ravasi and Schultz (2006) characterise organizational culture as a set of shared assumptions that guide behaviors. It is also the pattern of such collective behaviors and assumptions that are taught to new organizational members as a way of perceiving and, even thinking and feeling. Thus organizational culture affects the way people and groups interact with each other, with clients, and with stakeholders. In addition, organizational culture may affect how much employees identify with an organization.

Schein (1992), Deal and Kennedy (2000), and Kotter (1992) advanced the idea that organizations often have very differing cultures as well as subcultures. Although a company may have its "own unique culture", in larger organizations there are sometimes co-existing or conflicting subcultures because each subculture is linked to a different management team. Flamholtz and Randle (2011) suggest that one can view organizational culture as "corporate personality".
They define it as it consisting of the values, beliefs, and norms which influence the behavior of people as members of an organization.

The organizational culture influences the way people interact, the context within which knowledge is created, the resistance they will have towards certain changes, and ultimately the way they share (or the way they do not share) knowledge. According to Ravasi and Schultz (2006) and Allaire and Firsirotu (1984), organizational culture represents the collective values, beliefs and principles of organizational members. It may also be influenced by factors such as history, type of product, market, technology, strategy, type of employees, management style, and national culture. Culture includes the organization's vision, values, norms, systems, symbols, language, assumptions, environment, location, beliefs and habits.

Origins 
According to Jaques, "the culture of the factory is its customary and traditional way of thinking and doing of things, which is shared to a greater or lesser degree by all its members, and which new members must learn, and at least partially accept, in order to be accepted into service in the firm..." In simple terms, to the extent that people can share common wishes, desires and aspirations, they can commit themselves to work together. Sagiv (2011) and Dwyer (1997) noted that it is a matter of being able to care about the same things, and it applies to nations as well as to associations and organizations within nations.

Elaborating on the work in The Changing Culture of a Factory, Jaques said "Here is a list of valued entitlements that can reach the hearts of people, and gain from them their full commitment. Together they make up an organizational credo." This concept of requisite organization established a list of valued entitlements or organizational values that can gain from people their full commitment  Together they make an organizational culture or credo:

 These general values are reflected in a specific valuing of:

 Work for everyone at a level consistent with their level of potential capability, values and interests.
 Opportunity for everyone to progress as his or her potential capability matures, within the opportunities available in the organization.
 Fair and just treatment for everyone, including fair pay based upon equitable pay differentials for level of work and merit recognition related to personal effectiveness appraisal.
 Leadership interaction between managers and subordinates, including shared context, personal effectiveness appraisal, feedback and recognition, and coaching.
 Clear articulation of accountability and authority to engender trust and confidence in all working relationships.
 Articulation of long-term organizational vision through direct communication from the top.
 Opportunity for everyone individually or through representatives to participate in policy development.

The role of managerial leadership at every level [...] are the means of making these organizational values operationally real.New members of an organization integrate into the organizational culture in a process called organizational assimilation.

Usage 
Organizational culture refers to culture in any type of organization including that of schools, universities, not-for-profit groups, government agencies, or business entities. In business, terms such as corporate culture and company culture are often used to refer to a similar concept. The term corporate culture became widely known in the business world in the late 1980s and early 1990s. Corporate culture was already used by managers, sociologists, and organizational theorists by the beginning of the 80s. The related idea of organizational climate emerged in the 1960s and 70s, and the terms are now somewhat overlapping, as climate is one aspect of culture that focuses primarily on the behaviors encouraged by the organization.

Smircich (1983) categorized two main approaches to studying organizational culture: a variable and a process (root metaphor). The former could be an external or internal variable including values, norms, rituals, structures, principles, assumptions, beliefs, etc. (Driskill and Brenton, 2019), which is also considered difficult to be defined primarily across different national cultures. However, according to Harris and Moran (2000), if defined, it provides an understanding of how it influences productivity, performance, innovation, etc., and provides the key to winning over the competition. Thus, one can understand the importance of understanding how national culture influences the corporate culture is fundamental to analyze the uniqueness of an organization and its performance. On the other hand, the root metaphor suggests that organization is culture, and both terms are interchangeable. Culture describes the characteristic of an environment rather than explains an element it has. Driskill and Brenton (2019) clarified that culture could be researched as a shared cognition, systems of shared symbols, and as the expression of unconscious processes. Keyton (2011, in Littlejohn et al., 2010) noted that each organization has its own values, patterns, meaning, and understanding that are unique from other organizations that influence behavior and employees' communication activities.

If organizational culture is seen as something that characterizes an organization, it can be manipulated and altered depending on leadership and members. Culture as root metaphor sees the organization as its culture, created through communication and symbols, or competing metaphors. Culture is basic, with personal experience producing a variety of perspectives.

The organizational communication perspective on culture views culture in three different ways:
 Traditionalism: views culture through objective things such as stories, rituals, and symbols
 Interpretivism: views culture through a network of shared meanings (organization members sharing subjective meanings)
 Critical-interpretivism: views culture through a network of shared meanings as well as the power struggles created by a similar network of competing meanings.

Business executive Bernard L. Rosauer (2013) defines organizational culture as an emergence – an extremely complex incalculable state that results from the combination of a few ingredients. In "Three Bell Curves: Business Culture Decoded", Rosauer outlines the three manageable ingredients which (he claims) guide business culture:

 employee (focus on engagement)
 the work (focus on eliminating waste increasing value) waste
 the customer (focus on likelihood of referral)

Rosauer writes that the Three Bell Curves methodology aims to bring leadership, their employees, the work and the customer together for focus without distraction, leading to an improvement in culture and brand. He states: "If a methodology isn't memorable, it won't get used. The Three Bell Curves Methodology is simple (to remember) but execution requires strong leadership and diligence. Culture can be guided by managing the ingredients." Reliance of the research and findings of Sirota Survey Intelligence, which has been gathering employee data worldwide since 1972, the Lean Enterprise Institute, Cambridge, Massachusetts, and Fred Reichheld/Bain/Satmetrix research relating to NetPromoterScore.The Net Promoter Score (NPS) is defined as per Reichheld (2003)  as "a widely used market research metric that typically takes the form of a single survey question asking respondents to rate the likelihood that they would recommend a company, product, or a service to a friend or colleague." Colvin (2020) on the other hand elaborated the reason behind the popularity of this model due to its simple and transparent use method.

Ukrainian researcher Oleksandr Babych in his dissertation formulated the following definition: Corporate culture is a certain background of activity of the organization, which contributes to the strengthening of the vector of effectiveness depending on the degree of controllability of the conscious values of the organization, which is especially evident in dynamic changes in the structure or type of activity. This background includes a set of collective basic beliefs of the participants of the organization.

Typology of cultural types 
Typology refers to the "study of or analysis or classification based on types or categories". Organizational culture and climate may be erroneously used interchangeably. Organizational culture has been described as an organization's ideals, vision, and mission, whereas climate is better defined as employees' shared meaning related to the company's policies and procedures and reward/consequence systems. Many factors, ranging from depictions of relative strength to political and national issues, can contribute to the type or types of culture that can be observed in organizations and institutions of all sizes. Below are examples of organizational culture types.

Strong and weak typology of organizational culture
There are two types of cultures, namely, strong and weak. A strong culture is characterized by reinforcing tools such as ceremonies and policies to ensure instilling and spreading its norms and values (Madu, 2012), its focus and orientation towards its employees and their performance, and the group conformity (Ahmad, 2012). Also, it focuses on high-performance and constructive pressure. Such actions strongly influence the behavior of employees and their common purpose and, according to Karlsen (2011), are described as a successful culture.

Flamholtz and Randle state that: "A strong culture is one that people clearly understand and can articulate. A weak culture is one that employees have difficulty defining, understanding, or explaining."
Strong culture is said to exist where staff respond to stimulus because of their alignment to organizational values. In such environments, strong cultures help firms operate like well-oiled machines, engaging in outstanding execution with only minor adjustments to existing procedures as needed.

Conversely, there is weak culture where there is little alignment with organizational values, and control must be exercised through extensive procedures and bureaucracy.

Research by Büschgens et al. (2013) and Farkas (2013) shows that organizations that foster strong cultures have clear values that give employees a reason to embrace the culture. Chatman and Jehn (1994) and Oliva and Kallenberg (2003) noted that a "strong" culture may be especially beneficial to firms operating in the service sector since members of these organizations are responsible for delivering the service and for evaluations important constituents make about firms.  Organizations may derive the following benefits from developing strong and productive cultures:

 Better aligning the company towards achieving its vision, mission, and goals
 High employee motivation and loyalty
 Increased team cohesiveness among the company's various departments and divisions
 Promoting consistency and encouraging coordination and control within the company
 Shaping employee behavior at work, enabling the organization to be more efficient

Irving Janis defined groupthink as "a mode of thinking that people engage in when they are deeply involved in a cohesive in-group, when the members' strivings for unanimity override their motivation to realistically appraise alternative courses of action." This is a state in which even if group members have different ideas, they do not challenge organizational thinking. As a result, innovative thinking is stifled. Groupthink can lead to lack of creativity and decisions made without critical evaluation. Hogg (2001) and Deanne et al. (2013) clarified that Groupthink can occur, for example, when group members rely heavily on a central charismatic figure in the organization or where there is an "evangelical" belief in the organization's values. Groupthink can also occur in groups characterized by a friendly climate conducive to conflict avoidance.

Healthy 

Organizations should strive for what is considered a "healthy" organizational culture in order to increase productivity, growth, efficiency and reduce counterproductive behavior and turnover of employees. A variety of characteristics describe a healthy culture, including:

 Acceptance and appreciation for diversity
 Regard for fair treatment of each employee as well as respect for each employee's contribution to the company
 Employee pride and enthusiasm for the organization and the work performed
 Equal opportunity for each employee to realize their full potential within the company
 Strong communication with all employees regarding policies and company issues
 Strong company leaders with a strong sense of direction and purpose
 Ability to compete in industry innovation and customer service, as well as price
 Lower than average turnover rates (perpetuated by a healthy culture)
 Investment in learning, training, and employee knowledge

Additionally, performance oriented cultures have been shown to possess statistically better financial growth. Such cultures possess high employee involvement, strong internal communications and an acceptance and encouragement of a healthy level of risk-taking in order to achieve innovation. Additionally, organizational cultures that explicitly emphasize factors related to the demands placed on them by industry technology and growth will be better performers in their industries.

According to Kotter and Heskett (1992), organizations with adaptive cultures perform much better than organizations with unadaptive cultures. An adaptive culture translates into organizational success; it is characterized by managers paying close attention to all of their constituencies, especially customers, initiating change when needed, and taking risks. An unadaptive culture can significantly reduce a firm's effectiveness, disabling the firm from pursuing all its competitive/operational options.

Healthy companies are able to deal with employees' concerns about the well-being of the organization internally, before the employees would even feel they needed to raise the issues externally. It is for this reason that whistleblowing, particularly when it results in serious damage to a company's reputation, is considered to be often a sign of a chronically dysfunctional corporate culture.
Another relevant concept is the notion of "cultural functionality".  Specifically, some organizations have "functional" cultures while others have "dysfunctional" cultures. A "functional" culture is a positive culture that contributes to  an organization's performance and success. A "dysfunctional" culture is one that hampers or negatively affects  an organization's performance and success.

Management types of communication 

There are many different types of communication that contribute in creating an organizational culture:

 Metaphors such as comparing an organization to a machine or a family reveal employees' shared meanings of experiences at the organization.
 Stories can provide examples for employees of how to or not to act in certain situations.
 Rites and ceremonies combine stories, metaphors, and symbols into one. Several different kinds of rites affect organizational culture:
 Rites of passage: employees move into new roles
 Rites of degradation: employees have power taken away from them
 Rites of enhancement: public recognition for an employee's accomplishments
 Rites of renewal: improve existing social structures
 Rites of conflict reduction: resolve arguments between certain members or groups
 Rites of integration: reawaken feelings of membership in the organization
 Reflexive comments are explanations, justifications, and criticisms of our own actions. This includes:
 Plans: comments about anticipated actions
 Commentaries: comments about action in the present
 Accounts: comments about an action or event that has already occurred
 Such comments reveal interpretive meanings held by the speaker as well as the social rules they follow.
 Fantasy Themes are common creative interpretations of events that reflect beliefs, values, and goals of the organization. They lead to rhetorical visions, or views of the organization and its environment held by organization members.

Bullying culture type 

Bullying is seen to be prevalent in organizations where employees and managers feel that they have the support, or at least implicitly the blessing, of senior managers to carry on their abusive and bullying behaviour. Furthermore, new managers will quickly come to view this form of behaviour as acceptable and normal if they see others get away with it and are even rewarded for it.

When bullying happens at the highest levels, the effects may be far reaching. That people may be bullied irrespective of their organisational status or rank, including senior managers, indicates the possibility of a negative ripple effect, where bullying may be cascaded downwards as the targeted supervisors might offload their own aggression on their subordinates. In such situations, a bullying scenario in the boardroom may actually threaten the productivity of the entire organisation.

Tribal type of culture 
David Logan and coauthors have proposed in their book Tribal Leadership that organizational cultures change in stages, based on an analysis of human groups and tribal cultures. They identify five basic stages:
Life sucks (a subsystem severed from other functional systems like tribes, gangs and prison—2 percent of population);
My life sucks (I am stuck in the Dumb Motor Vehicle line and can't believe I have to spend my time in this lost triangle of ineffectiveness—25 percent of population);
I'm great (and you're not, I am detached from you and will dominate you regardless of your intent—48 percent of population);
We are great, but other groups suck (citing Zappo's and an attitude of unification around more than individual competence—22 percent of population) and
Life is great (citing Desmond Tutu's hearing on truth and values as the basis of reconciliation—3 percent of population).
This model of organizational culture provides a map and context for leading an organization through the five stages.

Personal culture

Organizational culture is taught to the person as culture is taught by his/her parents thus changing and modeling his/her personal culture. Indeed, employees and people applying for a job are advised to match their "personality to a company's culture" and fit to it. Some researchers even suggested and have made case studies research on personality changing.

National culture type
Corporate culture is used to control, coordinate, and integrate company subsidiaries. However differences in national cultures exist contributing to differences in the views on management. Differences between national cultures are deep rooted values of the respective cultures, and these cultural values can shape how people expect companies to be run, and how relationships between leaders and followers should be, resulting in differences between the employer and the employee regarding expectations. (Geert Hofstede, 1991) Perhaps equally foundational; observing the vast differences in national copyright (and taxation, etc.) laws suggests deep rooted differences in cultural attitudes and assumptions about property rights and sometimes about the desired root function, place, or purpose of corporations relative to the population.

Multiplicity

Xibao Zhang (2009) carried out an empirical study of culture emergence in the Sino-Western international cross-cultural management (SW-ICCM) context in China. Field data were collected by interviewing Western expatriates and Chinese professionals working in this context, supplemented by non-participant observation and documentary data. The data were then analyzed objectively to formulate theme-based substantive theories and a formal theory.

The major finding of this study is that the human cognition contains three components, or three broad types of "cultural rules of behavior", namely, Values, Expectations, and Ad Hoc Rules, each of which has a mutually conditioning relationship with behavior. The three cognitive components are different in terms of the scope and duration of their mutual shaping of behavior. Values are universal and enduring rules of behavior; Expectations, on the other hand, are context-specific behavioral rules; while Ad Hoc Rules are improvised rules of behavior that the human mind devises contingent upon a particular occasion. Furthermore, they need not be consistent, and frequently are not, among themselves. Metaphorically, they can be compared to a multi-carriage train, which allows for the relative lateral movements by individual carriages so as to accommodate bumps and turns in the tracks. In fact, they provide a "shock-absorber mechanism", so to speak, which enables individuals in SW-ICCM contexts to cope with conflicts in cultural practices and values, and to accommodate and adapt themselves to cultural contexts where people from different national cultural backgrounds work together over extended time. It also provides a powerful framework which explains how interactions by individuals in SW-ICCM contexts give rise to emerging hybrid cultural practices characterized by both stability and change.

One major theoretical contribution of this "multi-carriage train" perspective is its allowance for the existence of inconsistencies among the three cognitive components in their mutual conditioning of behavior. This internal inconsistency view is in stark contrast to the traditional internal consistency assumption explicitly or tacitly held by many culture scholars. The other major theoretical contribution, which follows logically from the first one, is to view culture as an overarching entity which is made of a multiplicity of Values, Expectations, and Ad Hoc Rules. This notion of one (multiplicity) culture to an organization leads to the classification of culture along its path of emergence into nascent, adolescent, and mature types, each of which is distinct in terms of the pattern of the three cognitive components and behavior.

Risk aware culture 
Risk aware culture refers to company have an over-all sense of potential risk they may faces. The suggested risk-aware culture components are leadership, involvement, learning, accountability and communication.

Effects
Research suggests that numerous outcomes have been associated either directly or indirectly with organizational culture.  A healthy and robust organizational culture may provide various benefits, including the following:

 Competitive edge derived from innovation and customer service
 Consistent, efficient employee performance
 Team cohesiveness
 High employee morale
 Strong company alignment towards goal achievement

Although little empirical research exists to support the link between organizational culture and organizational performance, there is little doubt among experts that this relationship exists.  Organizational culture can be a factor in the survival or failure of an organization – although this is difficult to prove given that the necessary longitudinal analyses are hardly feasible.  The sustained superior performance of firms like IBM, Hewlett-Packard, Procter & Gamble, and McDonald's may be, at least partly, a reflection of their organizational cultures.

A 2003 Harvard Business School study reported that culture has a significant effect on an organization's long-term economic performance. The study examined the management practices at 160 organizations over ten years and found that culture can enhance performance or prove detrimental to performance.  Organizations with strong performance-oriented cultures witnessed far better financial growth.  Additionally, a 2002 Corporate Leadership Council study found that cultural traits such as risk taking, internal communications, and flexibility are some of the most important drivers of performance, and may affect individual performance.  Furthermore, innovativeness, productivity through people, and the other cultural factors cited by Peters and Waterman (1982) also have positive economic consequences.

Denison, Haaland, and Goelzer (2004) found that culture contributes to the success of the organization, but not all dimensions contribute the same.  It was found that the effects of these dimensions differ by global regions, which suggests that organizational culture is affected by national culture.  Additionally, Clarke (2006) found that a safety climate is related to an organization's safety record.

Organizational culture is reflected in the way people perform tasks, set objectives, and administer the necessary resources to achieve objectives.  Culture affects the way individuals make decisions, feel, and act in response to the opportunities and threats affecting the organization.

Adkins and Caldwell (2004) found that job satisfaction was positively associated with the degree to which employees fit into both the overall culture and subculture in which they worked.  A perceived mismatch of the organization's culture and what employees felt the culture should be is related to a number of negative consequences including lower job satisfaction, higher job strain, general stress, and turnover intent.

It has been proposed that organizational culture may affect the level of employee creativity, the strength of employee motivation, and the reporting of unethical behavior, but more research is needed to support these conclusions.

Organizational culture also affects recruitment and retention.  Individuals tend to be attracted to and remain engaged in organizations that they perceive to be compatible.  Additionally, high turnover may be a mediating factor in the relationship between culture and organizational performance.  Deteriorating company performance and an unhealthy work environment are signs of an overdue cultural assessment.

Moreover, organizational culture also has an effect on knowledge sharing. Succeeding in knowledge transfer is highly dependent on an organizational culture that fosters, adopts and utilizes knowledge-transfer processes.Also, studies in transportation organizations (e. g. bus organizations) showed that organizational culture has an effect on road traffic crashes.

Change
When an organization does not possess a healthy culture or requires some kind of organizational culture change, the change process can be daunting. Organizational culture can hinder new change efforts, especially where employees know their expectations and the roles that they are supposed to play in the organization. This is corroborated by Mar (2016:1) who argues that 70% of all change efforts fail because of the culture of an organization's employees. One major reason why such change is difficult is that organizational cultures, and the organizational structures in which they are embedded, often reflect the "imprint" of earlier periods in a persistent way and exhibit remarkable levels of inertia. Culture change may be necessary to reduce employee turnover, influence employee behavior, make improvements to the company, refocus the company objectives and/or rescale the organization, provide better customer service, and/or achieve specific company goals and results. Culture change is affected by a number of elements, including the external environment and industry competitors, change in industry standards, technology changes, the size and nature of the workforce, and the organization's history and management. Some organizations change or modify their cultures with intentional directed effort 

There are a number of methodologies specifically dedicated to organizational culture change such as Peter Senge's Fifth Discipline. There are also a variety of psychological approaches that have been developed into a system for specific outcomes such as the Fifth Discipline's "learning organization" or Directive Communication's "corporate culture evolution". Ideas and strategies, on the other hand, seem to vary according to particular influences that affect culture.

Burman and Evans (2008) argue that it is 'leadership' that affects culture rather than 'management', and describe the difference. When one wants to change an aspect of the culture of an organization one has to keep in consideration that this is a long-term project. Corporate culture is something that is very hard to change and employees need time to get used to the new way of organizing. For companies with a very strong and specific culture it will be even harder to change.

Prior to a cultural change initiative, a needs assessment is needed to identify and understand the current organizational culture.  This can be done through employee surveys, interviews, focus groups, observation, customer surveys where appropriate, and other internal research, to further identify areas that require change.  The company must then assess and clearly identify the new, desired culture, and then design a change process.

Cummings & Worley (2004, p. 491–492) give the following six guidelines for cultural change, these changes are in line with the eight distinct stages mentioned by Kotter (1995, p. 2):
 Formulate a clear strategic vision (stage 1, 2, and 3). In order to make a cultural change effective a clear vision of the firm's new strategy, shared values and behaviors is needed. This vision provides the intention and direction for the culture change (Cummings & Worley, 2004, p. 490).
 Display top-management commitment (stage 4). It is very important to keep in mind that culture change must be managed from the top of the organization, as willingness to change of the senior management is an important indicator (Cummings & Worley, 2004, page 490). The top of the organization should be very much in favor of the change in order to actually implement the change in the rest of the organization. De Caluwé & Vermaak (2004, p 9) provide a framework with five different ways of thinking about change.
 Model culture change at the highest level (stage 5). In order to show that the management team is in favor of the change, the change has to be notable at first at this level. The behavior of the management needs to symbolize the kinds of values and behaviors that should be realized in the rest of the company. It is important that the management shows the strengths of the current culture as well; it must be made clear that the current organizational culture does not need radical changes, but just a few adjustments. (See for more: Deal & Kennedy, 1982; Sathe, 1983; Schall; 1983; Weick, 1985; DiTomaso, 1987). This process may also include creating committees, employee task forces, value managers, or similar. Change agents are key in the process and key communicators of the new values.  They should possess courage, flexibility, excellent interpersonal skills, knowledge of the company, and patience. As McCune (May 1999) puts it, these individuals should be catalysts, not dictators.
 The fourth step is to modify the organization to support organizational change.  This includes identifying what current systems, policies, procedures and rules need to be changed in order to align with the new values and desired culture.  This may include a change to accountability systems, compensation, benefits and reward structures, and recruitment and retention programs to better align with the new values and to send a clear message to employees that the old system and culture are in the past.
 Select and socialize newcomers and terminate deviants (stage 7 & 8  of Kotter, 1995, p. 2). A way to implement a culture is to connect it to organizational membership, people can be selected and terminated in terms of their fit with the new culture (Cummings & Worley, 2004, p. 491). Encouraging employee motivation and loyalty to the company is key and will also result in a healthy culture. The company and change managers should be able to articulate the connections between the desired behavior and how it will affect and improve the company's success, to further encourage buy-in in the change process. Training should be provided to all employees to understand the new processes, expectations and systems.
 Develop ethical and legal sensitivity. Changes in culture can lead to tensions between organizational and individual interests, which can result in ethical and legal problems for practitioners. This is particularly relevant for changes in employee integrity, control, equitable treatment and job security (Cummings & Worley, 2004, p. 491). It is also beneficial, as part of the change process, to include an evaluation process, conducted periodically to monitor the change progress and identify areas that need further development. This step will also identify obstacles of change and resistant employees, and acknowledge and reward employee improvement, which will encourage continued change and evolvement. It may also be helpful and necessary to incorporate new change managers to refresh the process. Outside consultants may also be useful in facilitating the change process and providing employee training. Change of culture in organizations is very important and inevitable. Cultural innovation is bound to be more difficult than cultural maintenance because it entails introducing something new and substantially different from what prevails in existing cultures. People often resist changes, hence it is the duty of management to convince people that likely gain will outweigh the losses. Besides institutionalization, deification is another process that tends to occur in strongly developed organizational cultures. The organization itself may come to be regarded as precious in itself, as a source of pride, and in some sense unique. The organization's members begin to feel a strong bond with it that transcends material returns, and they begin to identify with it. The organization turns into a sort of clan.

Mergers and cultural leadership
One of the biggest obstacles in the way of the merging of two organizations is organizational culture. Each organization has its own unique culture and most often, when brought together, these cultures clash. When mergers fail employees point to issues such as identity, communication problems, human resources problems, ego clashes, and inter-group conflicts, which all fall under the category of "cultural differences".

One way to combat such difficulties is through cultural leadership. Organizational leaders must also be cultural leaders and help facilitate the change from the two old cultures into the one new culture. This is done through cultural innovation followed by cultural maintenance.
 Cultural innovation includes:
 Creating a new culture: recognizing past cultural differences and setting realistic expectations for change
 Changing the culture: weakening and replacing the old cultures
 Cultural maintenance includes:
 Integrating the new culture: reconciling the differences between the old cultures and the new one
 Embodying the new culture: Establishing, affirming, and keeping the new culture

Corporate subcultures
Corporate culture is the total sum of the values, customs, traditions, and meanings that make a company unique. Corporate culture is often called "the character of an organization", since it embodies the vision of the company's founders. The values of a corporate culture influence the ethical standards within a corporation, as well as managerial behavior.

Senior management may try to determine a corporate culture. They may wish to impose corporate values and standards of behavior that specifically reflect the objectives of the organization. In addition, there will also be an extant internal culture within the workforce. Work-groups within the organization have their own behavioral quirks and interactions which, to an extent, affect the whole system. Roger Harrison's four-culture typology, adapted by Charles Handy, suggests that unlike organizational culture, corporate culture can be 'imported'. For example, computer technicians will have expertise, language and behaviors gained independently of the organization, but their presence can influence the culture of the organization as a whole.

Authors Gerard Egan and William Tate speak of organizations having a "shadow side". In Egan's work on the "shadow side" of organizations, he defined the shadow side as: 

Tate describes the shadow side as the "often disagreeable, messy, crazy and opaque aspects of [an] organisation's personality".

Legal aspects
Corporate culture can legally be found to be a cause of injuries and a reason for fining companies in the US, e.g., when the US Department of Labor Mine Safety and Health Administration levied a fine of more than 10.8 million US dollars on Performance Coal Co. following the Upper Big Branch Mine disaster in April 2010. This was the largest fine in the history of this U.S. government agency.

Research and models

Several methods have been used to classify organizational culture.  While there is no single "type" of organizational culture and organizational cultures vary widely from one organization to the next, commonalities do exist and some researchers have developed models to describe different indicators of organizational cultures.  Some are described below:

Hofstede 

Hofstede (1991) defined organizational culture as "the collective programming of the mind which distinguishes the members of one organization from another." Hofstede (1980) looked for differences between over 160 000 IBM employees in 50 countries and three regions of the world, in an attempt to find aspects of culture that might influence business behavior. He suggested things about cultural differences existing in regions and nations, and the importance of international awareness and multiculturalism for their own cultural introspection. Cultural differences reflect differences in thinking and social action, and even in "mental programs", a term Hofstede uses for predictable behavior. Hofstede relates culture to ethnic and regional groups, but also organizations, professional, family, social and subcultural groups, national political systems and legislation, etc.

Hofstede suggests the need for changing "mental programs" with changing behavior first, which will lead to value change. Though certain groups like Jews and Gypsies have maintained their identity through centuries, their values show adaptation to the dominant cultural environment.

Hofstede demonstrated that there are national and regional cultural groupings that affect the behavior of organizations and identified four dimensions of culture (later five) in his study of national cultures:

Power distance (Mauk Mulder, 1977) – Different societies find different solutions regarding social inequality. Although invisible, inside organizations power inequality of the "boss-subordinate relationships" is functional and according to Hofstede reflects the way inequality is addressed in the society. "According to Mulder's Power Distance Reduction theory subordinates will try to reduce the power distance between themselves and their bosses and bosses will try to maintain or enlarge it", but there is also a degree to which a society expects there to be differences in the levels of power. A high score suggests that there is an expectation that some individuals wield larger amounts of power than others. A low score reflects the view that all people should have equal rights.
Uncertainty avoidance is the way of coping with uncertainty about the future. Society copes with it with technology, law and religion (though different societies have different ways of addressing it), and according to Hofstede organizations deal with it with technology, law and rituals, or in two ways – rational and non-rational, with rituals being the non-rational. Hofstede listed some of the rituals as the memos and reports, some parts of the accounting system, a large part of the planning and control systems, and the nomination of experts.
Individualism vs. collectivism – disharmony of interests on personal and collective goals (Parsons and Shils, 1951). Hofstede raises the idea that society's expectations of Individualism/Collectivism will be reflected by the employee inside the organization. Collectivist societies will have more emotional dependence on members in their organizations; when in equilibrium an organization is expected to show responsibility to members. Extreme individualism is seen in the US. In fact, collectivism in the US is seen as "bad". Other cultures and societies than the US will therefore seek to resolve social and organizational problems in ways different from American ways. Hofstede says that a capitalist market economy fosters individualism and competition, and depends on it, but individualism is also related to the development of the middle class. Some people and cultures might have both high individualism and high collectivism. For example, someone who highly values duty to his or her group does not necessarily give a low priority to personal freedom and self-sufficiency.
Masculinity vs. femininity –  reflects whether a certain society is predominantly male or female in terms of cultural values, gender roles and power relations.
 Long- Versus Short-Term Orientation which he describes as "The long-term orientation dimension can be interpreted as dealing with society's search for virtue. Societies with a short-term orientation generally have a strong concern with establishing the absolute Truth. They are normative in their thinking. They exhibit great respect for traditions, a relatively small propensity to save for the future, and a focus on achieving quick results. In societies with a long-term orientation, people believe that truth depends very much on situation, context and time. They show an ability to adapt traditions to changed conditions, a strong propensity to save and invest, thriftiness, and perseverance in achieving results."

These dimensions refer to the effect of national cultures on management, and can be used to adapt policies to local needs.
In a follow up study, another model  is suggested for organizational culture. Soeters and Schreuder (1988) have used Hofstede's dimensions to study the interaction between national and organizational cultures in accounting firms.

O'Reilly, Chatman, and Caldwell 

Two common models and their associated measurement tools have been developed by O'Reilly et al. and Denison.

O'Reilly, Chatman & Caldwell (1991) developed a model based on the belief that cultures can be distinguished by values that are reinforced within organizations.  Their Organizational Cultural Profile (OCP) is a self-reporting tool which makes distinctions according eight categories – Innovation, Supportiveness, Stability, Respect for People, Outcome Orientation, Attention to Detail, Team Orientation, and Aggressiveness. The model is also suited to measure how organizational culture affects organizational performance, as it measures most efficient persons suited to an organization and as such organizations can be termed as having good organizational culture. Takeda (2007) explained that such model can measure both the person-situation fit and the person-culture fit. Such measurements allow to understand the level of  compatibility between employees and companies (culture). Employee values are measured against organizational values to predict employee intentions to stay and turnover. This is done through an instrument like Organizational Culture Profile (OCP) to measure employee commitment.

Daniel Denison 

Daniel Denison's model (1990) asserts that organizational culture can be described by four general dimensions – Mission, Adaptability, Involvement and Consistency.  Each of these general dimensions is further described by the following three sub-dimensions:

 Mission – Strategic Direction and Intent, Goals and Objectives and Vision
 Adaptability – Creating Change, Customer Focus and Organizational Learning
 Involvement – Empowerment, Team Orientation and Capability Development
 Consistency – Core Values, Agreement, Coordination/Integration

Denison's model also allows cultures to be described broadly as externally or internally focused as well as flexible versus stable.  The model has been typically used to diagnose cultural problems in organizations.

Deal and Kennedy 

Deal and Kennedy (1982) defined organizational culture as the way things get done around here.

Deal and Kennedy created a model of culture that is based on 4 different types of organizations. They each focus on how quickly the organization receives feedback, the way members are rewarded, and the level of risks taken:

Work-hard, play-hard culture: This has rapid feedback/reward and low risk resulting in: Stress coming from quantity of work rather than uncertainty. High-speed action leading to high-speed recreation. Examples: Restaurants, software companies.
Tough-guy macho culture: This has rapid feedback/reward and high risk, resulting in the following: Stress coming from high risk and potential loss/gain of reward. Focus on the present rather than the longer-term future. Examples: police, surgeons, sports.
Process culture: This has slow feedback/reward and low risk, resulting in the following: Low stress, plodding work, comfort and security. Stress that comes from internal politics and stupidity of the system. Development of bureaucracies and other ways of maintaining the status quo. Focus on security of the past and of the future. Examples: banks, insurance companies.
Bet-the-company culture: This has slow feedback/reward and high risk, resulting in the following: Stress coming from high risk and delay before knowing if actions have paid off. The long view is taken, but then much work is put into making sure things happen as planned. Examples: aircraft manufacturers, oil companies.

Edgar Schein 

According to Schein (1992), culture is the most difficult organizational attribute to change, outlasting organizational products, services, founders and leadership and all other physical attributes of the organization.  His organizational model illuminates culture from the standpoint of the observer, described at three levels: artifacts, espoused values and basic underlying assumptions.

At the first and most cursory level of Schein's model is organizational attributes that can be seen, felt and heard by the uninitiated observer – collectively known as artifacts. Included are the facilities, offices, furnishings, visible awards and recognition, the way that its members dress, how each person visibly interacts with each other and with organizational outsiders, and even company slogans, mission statements and other operational creeds.

Artifacts comprise the physical components of the organization that relay cultural meaning. Daniel Denison (1990) describes artifacts as the tangible aspects of culture shared by members of an organization. Verbal, behavioral and physical artifacts are the surface manifestations of organizational culture.

Rituals, the collective interpersonal behavior and values as demonstrated by that behavior, constitute the fabric of an organization's culture.  The contents of myths, stories, and sagas reveal the history of an organization and influence how people understand what their organization values and believes.  Language, stories, and myths are examples of verbal artifacts and are represented in rituals and ceremonies. Technology and art exhibited by members of an organization are examples of physical artifacts.

The next level deals with the professed culture of an organization's members – the values. Shared values are individuals' preferences regarding certain aspects of the organization's culture (e.g.  loyalty, customer service). At this level, local and personal values are widely expressed within the organization. Basic beliefs and assumptions include individuals' impressions about the trustworthiness and supportiveness of an organization, and are often deeply ingrained within the organization's culture. Organizational behavior at this level usually can be studied by interviewing the organization's membership and using questionnaires to gather attitudes about organizational membership.

At the third and deepest level, the organization's tacit assumptions are found.  These are the elements of culture that are unseen and not cognitively identified in everyday interactions between organizational members. Additionally, these are the elements of culture which are often taboo to discuss inside the organization.  Many of these 'unspoken rules' exist without the conscious knowledge of the membership.  Those with sufficient experience to understand this deepest level of organizational culture usually become acclimatized to its attributes over time, thus reinforcing the invisibility of their existence. Surveys and casual interviews with organizational members cannot draw out these attributes—rather much more in-depth means is required to first identify then understand organizational culture at this level.  Notably, culture at this level is the underlying and driving element often missed by organizational behaviorists.

Using Schein's model, understanding paradoxical organizational behaviors becomes more apparent.  For instance, an organization can profess highly aesthetic and moral standards at the second level of Schein's model while simultaneously displaying curiously opposing behavior at the third and deepest level of culture.  Superficially, organizational rewards can imply one organizational norm but at the deepest level imply something completely different.  This insight offers an understanding of the difficulty that organizational newcomers have in assimilating organizational culture and why it takes time to become acclimatized. It also explains why organizational change agents usually fail to achieve their goals: underlying tacit cultural norms are generally not understood before would-be change agents begin their actions. Merely understanding culture at the deepest level may be insufficient to institute cultural change because the dynamics of interpersonal relationships (often under threatening conditions) are added to the dynamics of organizational culture while attempts are made to institute desired change.

According to Schein (1992), the two main reasons why cultures develop in organizations is due to external adaptation and internal integration.  External adaptation reflects an evolutionary approach to organizational culture and suggests that cultures develop and persist because they help an organization to survive and flourish.  If the culture is valuable, then it holds the potential for generating sustained competitive advantages.  Additionally, internal integration is an important function since social structures are required for organizations to exist.  Organizational practices are learned through socialization at the workplace.  Work environments reinforce culture on a daily basis by encouraging employees to exercise cultural values.
Organizational culture is shaped by multiple factors, including the following:
 External environment
 Industry
 Size and nature of the organization's workforce
 Technologies the organization uses
 The organization's history and ownership

Gerry Johnson 

Gerry Johnson (1988) described a cultural web, identifying a number of elements that can be used to describe or influence organizational culture:

The paradigm: What the organization is about, what it does, its mission, its values.
Control systems: The processes in place to monitor what is going on. Role cultures would have vast rule-books. There would be more reliance on individualism in a power culture.
Organizational structures: Reporting lines, hierarchies, and the way that work flows through the business.
Power structures: Who makes the decisions, how widely spread is power, and on what is power based?
Symbols: These include organizational logos and designs, but also extend to symbols of power such as parking spaces and executive washrooms.
Rituals and routines: Management meetings, board reports and so on may become more habitual than necessary.
Stories and myths: build up about people and events, and convey a message about what is valued within the organization.

These elements may overlap.  Power structures may depend on control systems, which may exploit the very rituals that generate stories which may not be true.

Stanley G. Harris 

Schemata (plural of schema) are knowledge structures a person forms from past experiences, allowing the person to respond to similar events more efficiently in the future by guiding the processing of information.  A person's schemata are created through interaction with others, and thus inherently involve communication.

Stanley G. Harris (1994) argues that five categories of in-organization schemata are necessary for organizational culture:

Self-in-organization schemata: a person's concept of oneself within the context of the organization, including her/his personality, roles, and behavior.
Person-in-organization schemata: a person's memories, impressions, and expectations of other individuals within the organization.
Organization schemata: a subset of person schemata, a person's generalized perspective on others as a whole in the organization.
Object/concept-in-organization schemata: knowledge an individual has of organization aspects other than of other persons.
Event-in-organization schemata: a person's knowledge of social events within an organization.

All of these categories together represent a person's knowledge of an organization.
Organizational culture is created when the schematas (schematic structures) of differing individuals across and within an organization come to resemble each other (when any one person's schemata come to resemble another person's schemata because of mutual organizational involvement), primarily done through organizational communication, as individuals directly or indirectly share knowledge and meanings.

Charles Handy 

Charles Handy (1976), popularized Roger Harrison (1972) with linking organizational structure to organizational culture. The described four types of culture are:

Power culture: concentrates power among a small group or a central figure and its control is radiating from its center like a web. Power cultures need only a few rules and little bureaucracy but swift in decisions can ensue.
Role culture: authorities are delegated as such within a highly defined structure. These organizations form hierarchical bureaucracies, where power derives from the personal position and rarely from an expert power. Control is made by procedures (which are highly valued), strict roles descriptions and authority definitions. These organizations have consistent systems and are very predictable. This culture is often represented by a "Roman Building" having pillars. These pillars represent the functional departments.
Task culture: teams are formed to solve particular problems. Power is derived from the team with the expertise to execute against a task. This culture uses a small team approach, where people are highly skilled and specialized in their own area of expertise. Additionally, these cultures often feature the multiple reporting lines seen in a matrix structure.
Person culture: formed where all individuals believe themselves superior to the organization. It can become difficult for such organizations to continue to operate, since the concept of an organization suggests that a group of like-minded individuals pursue organizational goals. However some professional partnerships operate well as person cultures, because each partner brings a particular expertise and clientele to the firm.

Kim Cameron and Robert Quinn 

Kim Cameron and Robert Quinn (1999) conducted research on organizational effectiveness and success. Based on the Competing Values Framework, they developed the Organizational Culture Assessment Instrument that distinguishes four culture types.

Competing values produce polarities like flexibility vs. stability and internal vs. external focus – these two polarities were found to be most important in defining organizational success. The polarities construct a quadrant with four types of culture:

Clan culture (internal focus and flexible) – A friendly workplace where leaders act like father figures.
Adhocracy culture (external focus and flexible) – A dynamic workplace with leaders that stimulate innovation.
 Market culture (external focus and controlled) – A competitive workplace with leaders like hard drivers
Hierarchy culture (internal focus and controlled) – A structured and formalized workplace where leaders act like coordinators.

Cameron and Quinn designated six characteristics of organizational culture that can be assessed with the Organizational Culture Assessment Instrument (OCAI).

Clan cultures are most strongly associated with positive employee attitudes and product and service quality. Market cultures are most strongly related with innovation and financial effectiveness criteria. The primary belief in market cultures that clear goals and contingent rewards motivate employees to aggressively perform and meet stakeholders' expectations; a core belief in clan cultures is that the organization's trust in and commitment to employees facilitates open communication and employee involvement. These differing results suggest that it is important for executive leaders to consider the match between strategic initiatives and organizational culture when determining how to embed a culture that produces competitive advantage. By assessing the current organizational culture as well as the preferred situation, the gap and direction to change can be made visible as a first step to changing organizational culture.

Robert A. Cooke 

Robert A. Cooke defines culture as the behaviors that members believe are required to fit in and meet expectations within their organization. The Organizational Culture Inventory measures twelve behavioral norms that are grouped into three general types of cultures:

 Constructive cultures, in which members are encouraged to interact with people and approach tasks in ways that help them meet their higher-order satisfaction needs.
 Passive/defensive cultures, in which members believe they must interact with people in ways that will not threaten their own security.
 Aggressive/defensive cultures, in which members are expected to approach tasks in forceful ways to protect their status and security.

Constructive cultures 

In constructive cultures, people are encouraged to be in communication with their co-workers, and work as teams, rather than only as individuals. In positions where people do a complex job, rather than something simple like a mechanical task, this culture is efficient.

Achievement: completing a task successfully, typically by effort, courage, or skill (pursue a standard of excellence) (explore alternatives before acting) – Based on the need to attain high-quality results on challenging projects, the belief that outcomes are linked to one's effort rather than chance and the tendency to personally set challenging yet realistic goals. People high in this style think ahead and plan, explore alternatives before acting and learn from their mistakes.
Self-actualizing: realization or fulfillment of one's talents and potentialities – considered as a drive or need present in everyone (think in unique and independent ways) (do even simple tasks well) – Based on needs for personal growth, self-fulfillment and the realization of one's potential. People with this style demonstrate a strong desire to learn and experience things, creative yet realistic thinking and a balanced concern for people and tasks.
Humanistic-encouraging: help others to grow and develop (resolve conflicts constructively) – Reflects an interest in the growth and development of people, a high positive regard for them and sensitivity to their needs. People high in this style devote energy to coaching and counselling others, are thoughtful and considerate and provide people with support and encouragement.
Affiliative: treat people as more valuable than things (cooperate with others) – Reflects an interest in developing and sustaining pleasant relationships. People high in this style share their thoughts and feelings, are friendly and cooperative and make others feel a part of things.

Organizations with constructive cultures encourage members to work to their full potential, resulting in high levels of motivation, satisfaction, teamwork, service quality, and sales growth. Constructive norms are evident in environments where quality is valued over quantity, creativity is valued over conformity, cooperation is believed to lead to better results than competition, and effectiveness is judged at the system level rather than the component level. These types of cultural norms are consistent with (and supportive of) the objectives behind empowerment, total quality management, transformational leadership, continuous improvement, re-engineering, and learning organizations.

Passive/defensive cultures 

Norms that reflect expectations for members to interact with people in ways that will not threaten their own security are in the Passive/Defensive Cluster.

The four Passive/Defensive cultural norms are:

 Approval
 Conventional
 Dependent
 Avoidance

In organizations with Passive/Defensive cultures, members feel pressured to think and behave in ways that are inconsistent with the way they believe they should in order to be effective. People are expected to please others (particularly superiors) and avoid interpersonal conflict. Rules, procedures, and orders are more important than personal beliefs, ideas, and judgment. Passive/Defensive cultures experience a lot of unresolved conflict and turnover, and organizational members report lower levels of motivation and satisfaction.

Aggressive/defensive cultures 

This style is characterized with more emphasis on task than people. Because of the very nature of this style, people tend to focus on their own individual needs at the expense of the success of the group. The aggressive/defensive style is very stressful, and people using this style tend to make decisions based on status as opposed to expertise.

Oppositional – This cultural norm is based on the idea that a need for security that takes the form of being very critical and cynical at times.  People who use this style are more likely to question others work; however, asking those tough question often leads to a better product. Nonetheless, those who use this style may be overly-critical toward others, using irrelevant or trivial flaws to put others down.
Power – This cultural norm is based on the idea that there is a need for prestige and influence. Those who use this style often equate their own self-worth with controlling others. Those who use this style have a tendency to dictate others opposing to guiding others' actions.
Competitive – This cultural norm is based on the idea of a need to protect one's status. Those who use this style protect their own status by comparing themselves to other individuals and outperforming them.  Those who use this style are seekers of appraisal and recognition from others.
Perfectionistic – This cultural norm is based on the need to attain flawless results. Those who often use this style equate their self-worth with the attainment of extremely high standards. Those who often use this style are always focused on details and place excessive demands on themselves and others.

Organizations with aggressive/defensive cultures encourage or require members to appear competent, controlled, and superior. Members who seek assistance, admit shortcomings, or concede their position are viewed as incompetent or weak. These organizations emphasize finding errors, weeding out "mistakes" and encouraging members to compete against each other rather than competitors. The short-term gains associated with these strategies are often at the expense of long-term growth.

Adam Grant 

Adam Grant, author of the book Give and Take, distinguishes organizational cultures into giver, taker and matcher cultures according to their norms of reciprocity. In a giver culture, employees operate by "helping others, sharing knowledge, offering mentoring, and making connections without expecting anything in return", whereas in a taker culture "the norm is to get as much as possible from others while contributing less in return" and winners are those who take the most and are able to build their power at the expense of others. The majority of organizations are mid-way, with a matcher culture, in which the norm is to match giving with taking, and favours are mostly traded in closed loops.

In a study by Harvard researchers on units of the US intelligence system, a giver culture turned out to be the strongest predictor of group effectiveness.

As Grant points out, Robert H. Frank argues that "many organizations are essentially winner-take-all markets, dominated by zero-sum competitions for rewards and promotions". In particular, when leaders implement forced ranking systems to reward individual performance, the organisational culture tends to change, with a giver culture giving way to a taker or matcher culture. Also awarding the highest-performing individual within each team encourages a taker culture.

Stephen McGuire 

Stephen McGuire (2003) defined and validated a model of organizational culture that predicts revenue from new sources.  An Entrepreneurial Organizational Culture (EOC) is a system of shared values, beliefs and norms of members of an organization, including valuing creativity and tolerance of creative people, believing that innovating and seizing market opportunities are appropriate behaviors to deal with problems of survival and prosperity, environmental uncertainty, and competitors' threats, and expecting organizational members to behave accordingly.

Elements 

 People and empowerment focused
 Value creation through innovation and change
 Attention to the basics
 Hands-on management
 Doing the right thing
 Freedom to grow and to fail
 Commitment and personal responsibility
 Emphasis on the future

Eric Flamholtz
Eric Flamholtz (2001; 2011) has identified and validated a model of organizational culture components that drive financial results (Flamholtz and Randle, 2011). The model consist of five identified dimensions of  corporate culture: 1) treatment of customers, 2) treatment of people, 3) performance standards and accountability, 4) innovation and change, and 5) process orientation. These five dimensions have been confirmed by factor analysis (Flamholtz and Narasimhan-Kannan, 2005) in addition, Flamholtz has published empirical research that show the impact of organizational culture on financial performance (Flamholtz, 2001). Flamholtz has also proposed  that organizational (corporate) culture is not just an asset in the economic sense; but is also an "asset" in the conventional accounting sense (Flamholtz 2005). Flamholtz and Randle have also examined the evolution of organizational culture at different stages of organizational growth (Flamholtz and Randle, 2014).

Ethical frameworks and evaluations of corporate culture 
The cultural framework helps researchers to analyze culture with different ethnographic within organizations. Those frameworks can be categorized into the following: 
Frameworks including

1.    Kets de Vries and Miller (1984): the researcher linked neurotic styles with organizational functioning by focusing on the culture's negative features and aspects. They categorized cultures into Paranoid, Avoidant, Charismatic, Bureaucratic, and Schizoid.

2.    Mitroff and Kilmann (1975): the researchers studied managers' decision-making within a politicized culture and categorized culture types into Sensation thinking, Sensation feeling, Intuitive thinking, and Intuitive feeling.

3.    Sethia and Von Gilnow in 1985: the researchers categorized culture based on the company's main concern into Caring, Apathetic, Integrative, and Exacting.

4.    Deal and Kennedy (1982): the researchers defined cultures based on organizational environment, core beliefs, heroes of the culture, folklore, myths, rites, rituals of culture, and the cultural network.

5.    Jaeger (1978): the researcher classified cultures into types A (allows some decision making), J (tribal control), and Z (tribal decision making).

A cultural audit, on the other hand, is an assessment of an organization's values, and it helps organizations classify what corporate culture they have.

COVID-19 impact on organizational culture 
Since the COVID-19 outbreak, cultures have been redefined within different organizations, and the responsibility to fight the spread of the disease and its transmission, especially in workplaces become a collective responsibility. For that, employees who had returned to work at offices found it necessary to wear masks either by choice or by companies' regulations.

Joung (2020) explained that it is not new by any stretch to wear a mask in Asia; however, it became the new face of the culture in the rest of the world in retrospect after the pandemic hit at the beginning of 2020. Therefore, it is essential to understand the underlying cultural narrative behind wearing masks in Asia long before the COVID-19 pandemic.

Keggins (2021) explained the reason behind wearing masks to multiple reasons, including the spread of different types of flu in Asia over the years, such as; Spanish flu, Italian flu, Hong Kong flu, Avian flu, and Swine flu. Additionally, the spread of SARS, an increase of Pollen count and Hay fever, Great Kanto earthquake and its emissions of smoke, ash, gas, and air pollution, Tōkohu earthquake and tsunami, and radioactive particles. So naturally, after decades, wearing a mask became a common cultural practice, and wearing it is considered a good manner and a civic duty.

Somers (2021) categorized cultures based on whether the need of the individual or the group is favored on account of the other to individualistic and collectivism cultures, respectively. For example, wearing a mask is considered a characteristic of a collectivism culture, and thus the collective responsibility symbolizes solidarity and the new image of cultural value. Also, Joung (2020) explained that wearing masks could serve as a social firewall because it attracts less attention. However, Sorenson (2002, in Daum and Maraist, 2021) argued that one of the strong cultural characteristics is the resistance to the change, which puts it at a disadvantage, especially in times of pandemics and when implementing safety measures for employees. By contrast, Flynn & Chatman claimed that strong culture focuses on innovation, and thus it has a more tendency to change and adapt to crisis circumstances.

Bhattarai (2020) claimed that wearing face masks could lead to misinterpretation of attitudes during interactions because face-to-face meetings and conversation creates rapport and trust. Therefore, wearing a mask side by side with social distancing needs to be addressed as an issue to find solutions to develop a sustainable interaction between employees on one hand and employees with customers on the other hand. Having said that, Cleeland (2020) claimed that face masks are there to curtail the spread of the Corona Virus and not as a piece of personal protective equipment.

In light of this, as defined by Young and Maraist (2020), culture is the corporation personality that influences people's stances toward "conflict, change, failure, and success". Such influence results in imparting a sense of security and thus satisfaction for employees. Weston (2021) added that it influences employees' working experience, engagement, stress, happiness, satisfaction, motivation, and productivity, which leads us to discuss how did the COVID-19 impact the organizational cultures, working experience, and values.

Daum and Maraist (2021) discussed in their paper titled "The importance of culture in the era of COVID-19" that COVID-19 has affected organizational culture to a large extent. The authors explain the importance and urgent need for organizations to readdress concepts such as adversity and change pre and post-pandemic as that concept is the core definition of culture.

To this end, corporate life did not stop during the pandemic; instead, the pandemic changed how operations took place. As a result, the Strategist (2020) suggested that a new model emerged, namely the "geographically dispersed delivery model". In addition, Thomas (2021) noted that there became an accelerated utilization and adoption of digital tools to bridge distances. Such tools included; "videoconferencing, screen-sharing, digital shared file storage, simultaneous multi-authoring of documents, digital whiteboards, and smartphone chat groups."

However, the excessive use of technology as a primary way of communication has led to many issues, including Zoom fatigue. Additionally, newly hired employees, especially in the period of pandemics, faced difficulty assimilating into their teams due to working in a remote capacity. On the other hand, older employees met a changed dynamics where it is hard to overreach the organization's mission. Additionally, Klynn (2021) highlighted how cultures suffered, and employees felt disengaged, expandable rather than essential, alienated, and exhausted.

Klynn (2021) suggested many solutions to solve the lack of communication, advance the organization's strategies, and keep employees in connection with the company's core values. Such solutions included making employees feel valued, heard, and engaged, creating equity for all team members, communicating with employees through proactive conversation, identifying unnecessary old habits and getting rid of them, identifying newly emerged practices that proved valuable, designing and building the new culture/norm, and making change explicit. Similarly, Weston (2021) and Stoller (2020) stressed the need to invest in technology and multiple dissemination media to develop new policies and have iterative communication.

The Strategist (2020) suggested maintaining daily stand-ups, extending meeting time and skip meetings for informal conversation, enhancing the sense of community at work, and expressing more gratitude by saying thank you to colleagues who cannot see you. Also, Thomas (2021) suggested frequent check-ins.

After listing possible problems and their solutions that may happen due to remote work, Sull and Sull (2020) reported that during the pandemic, employees had rated their leadership highly on account of honest communication, integrity in addressing the pandemic, and more transparency than in preceding years. Also, employers and leaders have given more attention to employees' welfare and work agility during a time of turmoil. The authors concluded that such an outcome has a positive impact on cultural values. However, Chambers (2020) claimed that such results do not reflect the organizational culture change rather a response to the pandemic. Thus corporates need to incorporate such changes in the internal culture long after the pandemic is gone.

Deloitte (2020) argued that due to COVID-19, employees originated a sense of purpose, inspiration, and contribution. On the other hand, leaders became more tolerant of employees' failure because of a significant increase in experimenting and risk-taking, which led to improved productivity. Additionally, increased agility and flexibility in policies at work, side by side with a loose hierarchy that drives a culture of accountability. In comparison, De Castro and Meneses (2020) found that organizational culture is a precise predictor of innovation. Additionally, the pandemic has helped adhocracy cultures adopt product innovations and market cultures, process innovations.

To this end, Daum and Maraist (2021) explained that the meaning of a sense of purpose does not refer to the goals and productivity of a company; instead, it relates to humans/customers and the society of which employees are part. They claimed that depending on the sector, such value might differ, bringing a comparison between hospitals and retail shops. The former had a higher sense of purpose during the pandemic, where the latter had a less sense of purpose. They added that during COVID-19, companies, whether redefined or expanded their purposes to provide emergency assistance to society.  Also, the authors discussed how does the pandemic affects the way employees are treated by employers and the commitment to which employers took to ensure their safety as well as customers while at the same time focusing on making a profit.

Furthermore, remote work and dependence on technology as a primary way of communication resulted in creating subcultures within the central organizational culture. Having said that, subcultures initially existed in a traditional working setting and are considered as a part of a cohesive environment and the larger culture. For example, Spicer (2020) pointed out that some rituals used to occur near water coolers and are now being replaced by technological tools.

Critical views
Criticism of the usage of the term by managers began already in its emergence in the early 80s. Most of the criticism comes from the writers in critical management studies who for example express skepticism about the functionalist and unitarist views about culture that are put forward by mainstream management writers. They stress the ways in which these cultural assumptions can stifle dissent towards management and reproduce propaganda and ideology. They suggest that organizations do not encompass a single culture, and cultural engineering may not reflect the interests of all stakeholders within an organization.

Parker (2000) has suggested that many of the assumptions of those putting forward theories of organizational culture are not new. They reflect a long-standing tension between cultural and structural (or informal and formal) versions of what organizations are. Further, it is reasonable to suggest that complex organizations might have many cultures, and that such sub-cultures might overlap and contradict each other. The neat typologies of cultural forms found in textbooks rarely acknowledge such complexities, or the various economic contradictions that exist in capitalist organizations.

Among the strongest and most widely recognized writers on corporate culture, with a long list of articles on leadership, culture, gender and their intersection, is Linda Smircich. As a part of the critical management studies, she criticizes theories that attempt to categorize or 'pigeonhole' organizational culture. She uses the metaphor of a plant root to represent culture, saying that it drives organizations rather than vice versa. Organizations are the product of organizational culture; we are unaware of how it shapes behavior and interaction (also implicit in Schein's (2002) underlying assumptions of the organization. According to Packer (2002), Schein's underlying assumptions are the beliefs, perceptions, thoughts, and feelings taken for granted and can be observed and considered the ultimate source of values and action. Such assumptions are categorized into assumptions about the problem (what is the organization trying to achieve), assumptions about the solution, and assumptions on how to organize to achieve a solution?. Such assumptions undermines attempts to categorize and define organizational culture.

See also

References

Notes
 
 Burman, R. and Evans, A.J. (2008) "Target Zero: A Culture of safety", Defence Aviation Safety Centre Journal, pp. 22–27.
 Cameron, Kim S. & Quinn, Robert E. (1999), Diagnosing and Changing Organizational Culture: Based on the Competing Values Framework, Prentice Hall, reprinted John Wiley & Sons, 2011
 
 Cummings, Thomas G. & Worley, Christopher G. (2004), Organization Development and Change, 8th Ed., South-Western College Pub.
 Denison, Daniel R. (1990) Corporate culture and organizational effectiveness, Wiley.
 Denison, Daniel R., Haaland, S. and Goelzer, P. (2004) "Corporate Culture and Organizational Effectiveness: Is Asia Different from the Rest of the World?" Organizational Dynamics, pp. 98–1 09
 

Flamholtz, Eric G and Randle, Yvonne (2011), "Corporate Culture: The Ultimate Strategic Advantage," Stanford University Press, Stanford California, pp. 5–6 and 26–27. 
Flamholtz, Eric and  Randle Yvonne,(2014).  "Implications of organizational Life Cycles for Corporate Culture and Climate," Chapter 13 in B. Schneider and K. Barbera, The oxford Handbook of organizational Climate and Culture, Oxford Library of psychology, Oxford university press, 2014, pp. 235–265.
 Handy, Charles B. (1976) Understanding Organizations, Oxford University Press
 
 Harrison, Roger (1972) Understanding your organisation's character, Harvard Business Review
 Hofstede, Geert (1980) Culture's Consequences: International Differences in Work Related Values, Beverly Hills, CA, Sage Publications, reprinted 1984
 Hofstede, Geert (1991), Cultures and Organizations: Software of the Mind., McGraw-Hill Professional
 
 McGuire, Stephen J.J. (2003). "Entrepreneurial Organizational Culture: Construct Definition and Instrument Development and Validation, Ph.D. Dissertation", The George Washington University, Washington, DC.
 Mulder, Mauk (1977) The daily power game, Martinus Nijhoff Socìal Sciences Division
 
 Parker, M. (2000) Organizational Culture and Identity, London: Sage.
 Parsons, Talcott, Shils, Edward (1951), Toward a General Theory of Action, reprinted as Parsons, Talcott, Shils, Tolman, Stouffer and Kluckhohn et al., Toward a General Theory of Action: Theoretical foundations of the Social Sciencies, Transaction Publishers, 2001
 Peters and Waterman (1982). In Search of Excellence. Harper & Row  (New York).
 Stoykov, Lubomir (1995). Фирмената култура и комуникация  (Company culture and communication), Stopanstvo, Sofia.
 Zhang, Xibao (2009). Values, Expectations, Ad Hoc Rules, and Culture Emergence in International Cross Cultural Management Contexts. New York: Nova Science Publishers.

Further reading
 
 Black, Richard J. (2003) Organizational Culture: Creating the Influence Needed for Strategic Success, London UK, 
 
 Boddy, C. R. (2011) Corporate Psychopaths: Organizational Destroyers, Palgrave Macmillan
 
 Jex, Steven M. Jex  & Britt,  Thomas W. (2008) Organizational Psychology, A Scientist-Practitioner Approach, John Wiley & Sons, .
 Kleinbaum, Rob and Aviva (2013). Creating a Culture of Profitability, Probabilistic Publishing, .
 
 
 O'Donovan, Gabrielle (2006).  The Corporate Culture Handbook: How to Plan, Implement and Measure a Successful Culture Change Programme, The Liffey Press, 
 Papa, Michael J., et al. (2008). Organizational Communication Perspectives and Trends (4th Ed.). Sage Publications.
 Phegan, B. (1996–2000) Developing Your Company Culture, A Handbook for Leaders and Managers, Context Press, 
 Sopow, E. (2007). Corporate personality disorder. Lincoln Neb.: iUniverse.
 Luthans, F. & Doh Jonathan, P. (2015). "International Management, Culture, Strategy and Behavior" (9th ed.). Mc Graw Hill

External links
Organizational Culture and Institutional Transformation (pdf) – From the Education Resources Information Center Clearinghouse on Higher Education Washington, DC; Corporate executives discuss the importance of building a healthy, effective organizational culture 
Organizational Culture, Joel Peterson (Chairman of JetBlue Corporation and managing partner of Trammell Crow Company), Stanford Graduate School of Business 
Organizational Culture Trumps Strategy, Mindy Grossman (CEO of the Home Shopping Network [HSN]), Stanford Graduate School of Business 
  Organizational Culture,  Isadore Sharp (founder and chairman of Four Seasons Hotels and Resorts), Stanford Graduate School of Business
Organizational Debt is like Technical debt – but worse, Steve Blank (entrepreneur, investor and Stanford University professor)



 
Industrial and organizational psychology
Corporatism
Cultural economics
Cultural studies
Human resource management
Labour law